George Augustus Frederick may refer to:

George Frederic Augustus I, king of the Miskito 1801–1824
George Augustus Frederic II, king of the Miskito 1845–1864
George IV of the United Kingdom, king of the United Kingdom and Hanover, 1820-1830

See also